John Boyd Etnyre  is an American mathematician at the Georgia Institute of Technology, and his research fields include contact geometry, symplectic geometry and low-dimensional topology. He earned his Ph.D. in 1996 from the University of Texas, Austin under the supervision of Robert Gompf. Etnyre was a postdoctoral scholar at Stanford University from 1997-2001. He was a faculty member at the University of Pennsylvania prior to joining the faculty at the Georgia Institute of Technology.

In 2013, Etnyre was in the Inaugural Class of Fellows of the American Mathematical Society. He received a National Science Foundation CAREER grant award in 2003, and in 2015-2016 he was a Simons Fellow in Mathematics. Etnyre serves as a Principal Editor for the journal of Algebraic & Geometric Topology.

References 

21st-century American mathematicians
Year of birth missing (living people)
Living people
Georgia Tech faculty
Fellows of the American Mathematical Society
Topologists
University of Pennsylvania faculty